Mompach is a village in the commune of Rosport-Mompach in eastern Luxembourg. It is part of the canton of Echternach, which is part of the district of Grevenmacher.

Until 31 December 2017, it was a commune. On 1 January 2018, the commune was merged with Rosport to form the new commune of Rosport-Mompach.

Former commune
The former commune consisted of the villages:
 Born
 Givenich
 Herborn
 Moersdorf
 Mompach
 Boursdorf (lieu-dit)
 Lilien (lieu-dit)

References

External links
 

 
Villages in Luxembourg
Former communes of Luxembourg